Azykh Cave, also referred to as Azokh Cave is a six-cave complex in Azerbaijan, known as a habitation site of prehistoric humans. It is situated near the village of Azykh in the Khojavend District.

The cave is an important prehistoric site, which has been occupied by different human groups for a long time. The ancient layers of the Middle Paleolithic have yielded Neanderthal fossil remains that may date from around 300,000 years ago.

The discovery of the cave 
The cave was discovered by the "Palaeolithic Archaeological Expedition" of the Azerbaijan National Academy of Sciences under the leadership of Mammadali Huseynov in 1960 and is considered to be the site of one of the most ancient locations of proto-human presence in Eurasia. A Neanderthal-like jaw bone found in 1968 is assumed to be over 300,000 years old and thus one of the oldest proto-human remains found in Central Asia. Its discovery gave rise to the term Azykh Man. Archaeologists have suggested that the finds from the lowest layers are of a pre-Acheulean culture (730,000 to 1,800,000 years ago), that resembles the Olduwan culture named after Tanzania's Olduvai Gorge in many respects.

The poor quality of the 1960s excavation, in which no taphonomic data was collected, led to uncertainties over the chronological sequence of the layers. Excavations resumed in the mid-1990s. In 2002 an international research team headed by Tania King discovered undisturbed entrances to the cave as well as fauna and stone tools. Fossil assemblages recovered from the excavations between 2002 and 2009 found Pleistocene-era remains of bears accumulated as a result of hibernation, but no evidence for simultaneous occupation of the cave by bears and hominins. Other faunal remains, mainly herbivores, had been brought to the cave by hominins, but butchering had taken place somewhere else, not at the rear of the cave where the remains were found. When cave sediments reached close to the cave roof, the cave ceased to be used by hominins. Finally, during the Holocene, the upper sediments were eroded by water, opening up the cave to renewed human use. 

The cave is now considered to have housed some of the earliest groups of proto-humans in Eurasia. Using uranium isotopes as a speleothem dating method, the minimum date for the formation of the cave, and thus the earliest hominid deposits, have been dated to 1.19 ±0.08 million years.

On 24 November 2020, archeological finds in the cave were brought to Baku by the representatives of the Azerbaijani State Security Service and placed in the Archaeological Fund of the Institute of Archeology and Ethnography of ANAS.

Layers 

Archaeological layers registered in the Azykh Paleolithic Cave during archaeological excavations are as follows:

The first layer 
The first layer is composed of black sediments, sometimes yellow mixed soil. During the archaeological excavations, clay dishes belonging to medieval times were found. During the archaeological excavations carried out in 1962–1965, parts of clay dishes belonging to the Middle Ages, Bronze Age, and Eneolithic period were found. However, during archaeological excavations in subsequent years, the material remains belonging to the Eneolithic period were not registered. The total thickness of the layer was 77–125 cm.

The second layer 
The second layer consists of light-yellowish clay soil. During the archeological investigations, a piece of individual rock and clay dishes were registered inside the layer. Clay dishes have mainly belonged to the medieval, Bronze, and Eneolithic periods. The total thickness of the layer was 90–180 cm.

The third layer 
The third layer consists of gray soil. According to different features, three stratums were identified in the third layer during the archeological excavations conducted between 1973 and 1974:

The first stratum 
The first stratum consists of dark-gray soil. Parts of small rock are also found inside of stratum. For the first time, stone products and hunted animal bones belonging to Mousterian were found in this stratum.

The second stratum 
The second stratum consists of clay soil. Inside the stratum, rock fractures falling from the ceiling of the cave were registered. At the same time, several large rock stones were discovered inside the stratum.

The third stratum 
The third stratum consists of light gray clay rocks where rock fractures were found. The lower part of the stratum consists of yellow soil. During the archeological excavations conducted in 1973 for the first time, 20 tools like axe belonging to Mousterian were found in the lower stratum of the third layer. These were one of the rarest findings of the Mousterian excavations because these tools were characterizing the Acheulean period. The overall thickness of the third stratum was 90–145 cm.

The fourth layer 
The fourth layer consists of dark-brown clay soil. There are small rock fractures on the strata. These fractures are made of stalagmites, stalactites, stalagmitic pieces. No material culture examples from the fourth layer have been registered until the 1973 archaeological excavations. However, during the archeological excavations carried out in 1973, several stone items and hunted animal bones belonging to the last Acheulean were found in the fourth layer. The total thickness of the layer reaches 1-1.2 m.

The fifth layer 
The fifth layer consists of yellow soil. The richest and thickest sediment in the stratigraphy of the Azykh cave is in the fifth layer. During the 1963–1969 and 1971–1986 years according to archeological excavations carried out on the fifth layer, numerous hunted animal bones and 300 pieces of stone were found. In the fifth layer of the Azykh cave, which has the richest stratigraphy within the Greater Caucasus paleolithic caves, fireplaces for cooking, primary building installations, and saved bear skulls were found. In the entire research season, the following smaller stratum were discovered in the fifth layer:

The first stratum 
The first stratum consists of dark-brown clay soil. In addition to archeological findings, rock fractures have also been found. The thickness of the stratum is 30–43 cm.

The second stratum 
The second stratum consists of light-brown clay soil. Stones products and fauna remains were found inside the stratum. The thickness of the stratum was 28–44 cm.

The third stratum 
The third stratum consists of light-yellow clay soil. During the archaeological excavations, plenty of hunted animal bones were found along with stone products. The thickness of the stratum was 48–62 cm.

The fourth stratum 
The fourth stratum consists of dark yellow clay soil. Along with archaeological materials, small rock fractures have also been found in it. The thickness of the stratum reaches 38–44 cm.

The fifth stratum 
The fifth stratum consists of gray-green clay soil. During the research, hunted animal bones were found along with labor tools. The thickness of the stratum was 44–56 cm.

The sixth stratum 
The sixth stratum consists of dark-brown clay soil. During the archaeological excavations, many fauna remains were found along with labor tools. There are rock fractures falling from the ceiling of the cave. The thickness of the stratum was 42–56 cm.

The sixth layer 
The sixth layer consists of gray clay soil. However, in comparison with other layers mentioned above, the sixth layer is rich in quite a lot of gravels and rock stones. More than 3,000 pieces of stone were found here. The thickness of the layer was 55–87 cm.

The seventh layer 
The seventh layer is composed of a light-blue clay layer. In the articles about the Azykh Cave published in 1974 on archaeological excavations indicated that there was no archaeological material remains below the 6th layer. However, during archaeological excavations in sediments of the cave below the 6th layer, in 1974, four archeological layers (7th–10th layers) were registered and material remains were found in these layers. The thickness of the layer was 82–98 cm.

The eighth layer 
The eighth layer is composed of dark-blue clay. During the archaeological excavations, the material remains were discovered inside of the layer. At the same time, single rock pieces falling from the ceiling of the cave were found. The thickness of the base was 90–115 cm.

The ninth layer 
The ninth layer is composed of open-blue clay soil. During the archaeological excavations, culture samples were found inside of the layer. The thickness of the layer was 78–84 cm.

The tenth layer 
The tenth layer is composed of yellow clay soil, relatively with more stone layers. During the archaeological excavations, stone tools were found inside of this layer. The layer is quite hard as it is located on the surface of the rock. The thickness of the layer was 78–83 cm.

In the Hague convention 
The implementing regulations defining the rules for applying the convention and a protocol prohibiting the removal of cultural values from the occupied territories have been adopted In the Hague convention.

Another document on the protection of cultural property in the occupied territories was adopted within the framework of the 8th session of the Committee for Cultural Property during the UNESCO's Armed Conflict in Paris in 2012.

According to the information of Azerbaijani Foreign Affairs Ministry, discussion of the protection of cultural property at the occupied territories by Committee was initiated by Azerbaijan in 2012 and according to the 2012 decision, to prepare a relevant document for the protection of cultural property, at the territories occupied, was required by the Secretariat.

There was the Hague Convention 1954 and its two protocols on the Protection of Cultural Property during armed conflicts, legal analysis of the provisions relating to the occupied territories, the mechanisms for the implementation of those provisions and other aspects in the document prepared by the Secretariat.

In the results section of the document, it was noted that the UNESCO technical missions could be sent for monitoring the situation related to the protection of cultural monuments at the territories occupied.

See also
 Janapar, a hiking trail that passes by Azykh Cave

References

External links

About Azokh Cave

1960 archaeological discoveries
Archaeology of Azerbaijan
Caves of Azerbaijan
Prehistoric sites in Azerbaijan
Archaeological sites in Azerbaijan